Leif Olav Alnes (born 29 January 1957) is a Norwegian athletics coach.

He originally hails from Torvikbukt. When moving to Oslo to study at the Norwegian School of Sport Sciences, whence he graduated in biomechanics, he became a coach in IK Tjalve.

Having coached many athletes, Alnes is best known as the coach of Geir Moen and later Karsten Warholm, in a training group also consisting of Amalie Iuel and Elisabeth Slettum.

References

1957 births
Living people
People from Møre og Romsdal
Norwegian School of Sport Sciences alumni
Norwegian athletics coaches
Sportspeople from Møre og Romsdal